Hypostomus micromaculatus is a species of catfish in the family Loricariidae. It is native to South America, where it occurs in the upper and middle Suriname River basin. The species reaches  in standard length and is believed to be a facultative air-breather.

Hypostomus micromaculatus sometimes appears in the aquarium trade, where it is typically referred to as the smallspotted Suriname pleco.

References 

Catfish of South America
micromaculatus
Fish described in 1968